Cheremshanka is a rural locality (a settlement) in Proletarsky Selsoviet, Altaysky District, Altai Krai, Russia. The population was 2 as of 2013. There is 1 street.

Geography 
Cheremshanka is located 34 km south of Altayskoye (the district's administrative centre) by road. Basargino is the nearest rural locality.

References 

Rural localities in Altaysky District, Altai Krai